aka Stray Cat Rock: Delinquent Girl Boss, Female Juvenile Delinquent Leader: Alleycat Rock, Wildcat Rock is a 1970 Japanese outlaw biker film directed by Yasuharu Hasebe and starring Akiko Wada and Meiko Kaji. It is the first entry in the five-film Alleycat Rock or Stray Cat Rock series and was followed by Stray Cat Rock: Wild Jumbo, Stray Cat Rock: Sex Hunter, Stray Cat Rock: Machine Animal and Alleycat Rock: Crazy Riders '71.

Plot
Tough girl biker Ako (pop singer Akiko Wada) comes across Mei (Meiko Kaji) and her girl gang (the Alleycats/Stray Cats) as they are about to have a knife fight in Shinjuku, Tokyo with another gang of girls. When the second gang calls in their boyfriends for help, Ako joins in and turns the tide for Mei and her gang and becomes a leader figure for the girls. Meanwhile, Mei's boyfriend Michio (Kōji Wada) wants to join some right-wing nationalists, the Seiyu Group. To prove himself, he induces an old friend Kelly (Ken Sanders) to throw a boxing match so the Seiyu Group can cash in betting against him. But when the boxer, encouraged by Ako and Mei, wins the fight, the Seiyu Group takes their anger out on Michio until Mei and the Alleycats rescue him. But Mei and the girls are now on the run from the powerful group. Michio and Mei are eventually killed and Ako leaves Shinjuku, roaring away on her bike.

Cast
 Akiko Wada as Ako
 Meiko Kaji as Mei
 Kōji Wada as Michio Yagami
 Bunjaku Han as Yuriko
 Yuka Kemari as Mari
 Hanako Tokachi as Hanako
 Yūko Shimazu as Yūko
 Yuka Ōhashi ( as Yuka
 Miki Yanagi as Miki
 Toshimitsu Shima ( as Maabō
 George Fujita as Hiroshi 
 Ken Sanders as Kelly Fujiyama
 Gorō Mutsumi as Hanada
 Tatsuya Fuji as Katsuya
 Yōsui Inoue  (as Andre Candre)

Background 
Alleycat Rock: Female Boss was designed by Nikkatsu to compete with Toei's Delinquent Boss series, which, in turn, had been inspired by Roger Corman's early outlaw biker film, The Wild Angels (1966). Nikkatsu also meant the film to showcase the popular singer Akiko Wada, and to appeal to her young audience. Co-star Meiko Kaji, however, attracted the most audience attention, and she became the star of the remaining episodes in the Alleycat Rock series. Nikkatsu regarded Alleycat Rock: Female Boss as a prototype for a new direction for the studio and its success ensured the studio's move towards youth-oriented action films.

Director Hasebe and cult screenwriter-director Atsushi Yamatoya wrote the script to Alleycat Rock: Female Boss. Because of the film's low budget, the studio gave Hasebe and Yamatoya more creative freedom than was generally the case for Nikkatsu's staff at this time. Of the distinctive look of Alleycat Rock: Female Boss, Hasebe recalled, "I tried to infuse those movies with the culture of the time. I spent a lot of time visiting places where people hung out. At the time, protest songs were popular, so I included them in the soundtrack. I remember, one day I noticed a big fuss near the west entrance of Shinjuku station. Activists were gathering and protesting against the US-Japanese Security Treaty. These people were like the hippies in the States. I found them interesting. Cinematic. I wanted my film to be this modern."

Critical appraisal
The Weissers, in their Japanese Cinema Encyclopedia: The Sex Films, judge Alleycat Rock: Female Boss to be better than Toei's Delinquent Boss series, with which it was meant to compete, and call the series, "a prime example of sexually oriented-action movies, five excellent entries over a two year period". The style of the series, according to the Weissers, is "Ultra-chic, yet surprisingly grim". Allmovie writes that Alleycat Rock: Female Boss is "Good-looking and fast-paced".

Availability
Alleycat Rock: Female Boss was released theatrically in Japan on May 2, 1970. It was released on DVD on December 8, 2006.

Bibliography

English
 
 Hasebe, Yasuharu. (1998). Interviewed by Thomas and Yuko Mihara Weisser in Tokyo, 1999, in Asian Cult Cinema, #25, 4th Quarter, 1999, p. 32-42.

Japanese

Notes

1970 films
Films directed by Yasuharu Hasebe
1970s Japanese-language films
Nikkatsu films
Stray Cat Rock
Juvenile delinquency in fiction
Japanese action thriller films
Pink films
1970s exploitation films
Sexploitation films
Outlaw biker films
1970s Japanese films